Ogyris is an Australasian genus of butterflies in the family Lycaenidae.

Species
Ogyris abrota Westwood, 1851
Ogyris aenone Waterhouse, 1902
Ogyris amaryllis Hewitson, 1862
Ogyris aurantiaca Rebel, 1912
Ogyris barnardi Miskin, 1890
Ogyris faciepicta Strand, 1911
Ogyris genoveva Hewitson, [1853]
Ogyris halmaturia (Tepper, 1890)
Ogyris ianthis Waterhouse, 1900
Ogyris idmo Hewitson, 1862
Ogyris iphis Waterhouse & Lyell, 1914
Ogyris meeki Rothschild, 1900
Ogyris olane Hewitson, 1862
Ogyris oroetes Hewitson, 1862
Ogyris otanes C. & R. Felder, [1865]
Ogyris subterrestris Field, 1999
Ogyris zosine Hewitson, [1853]

References

 ; ;  2011: The nomenclature of Ogyris halmaturia (Tepper, 1890) (Lepidoptera: Lycaenidae).  Australian Entomologist, 38(1): 29-36. PDF of whole issue
, 1988. Catalogue of Lycaenidae & Riodinidae (Lepidoptera: Rhopalocera). Bridges, Urbana, Illinois.
 1973: The higher classification of the Lycaenidae (Lepidoptera): a tentative arrangement. Bulletin of the British Museum (Natural History), entomology, 28: 371-505.
  2010: The taxonomy of Ogyris halmaturia (Tepper, 1890) stat. nov. (Lepidoptera: Lycaenidae).  Australian Journal of Entomology, 49(2): 114-120. 
, 1971. Australian Butterflies. 200pp. Nelson, Melbourne.
, 1998. The Butterflies of Papua New Guinea Academic Press, 
, [1851]. In  1846-1852,  The genera of diurnal Lepidoptera, 2. pp. 251-534, pls. 31-80 + suppl. pl. London.

External links
"Ogyris Angas, 1847" at Markku Savela's Lepidoptera and Some Other Life Forms

Arhopalini
Lycaenidae genera